Laura Castelli (born 14 September 1986 in Turin) is an Italian politician.

Biography
After the graduation with a Bachelor's degree in Business Economics, she worked for a short period in a tax assistance center.

In the 2013 general elections, she was elected Deputy among the ranks of the Five Star Movement. She was re-elected Deputy in the 2018 general elections. After participating in the drafting of the so-called "government contract" between Five Star Movement and League, on 12 June she was appointed Undersecretary at the Ministry of Economy in the Conte Government.

On 21 March 2019 she was promoted, together with Massimo Garavaglia (Lega Nord), Deputy Minister of Economy. She was confirmed Deputy Minister in the Conte II Cabinet.

On 28 June 2021 the tribunal of Turin has convicted Laura Castelli for aggravated defamation. The proceeding concerned a post on Facebook in which she edited a photo to make believe a flirt between Piero Fassino and a PD candidate for the 2016 administrative elections, Lidia Roscaneanu. She was sentenced to a fine of 1032 euro and a damage compensation of 5000 euro.

References

1986 births
Living people
Five Star Movement politicians
Deputies of Legislature XVII of Italy
Deputies of Legislature XVIII of Italy
Politicians from Turin
University of Turin alumni
21st-century Italian women politicians
Women members of the Chamber of Deputies (Italy)